The Man from Majorca is a 1984 Swedish crime thriller film directed by Bo Widerberg. It is based on the novel The Pig Party by Leif G. W. Persson. The film stars Sven Wollter and Tomas von Brömssen.

The novel has big similarities with the Geijer affair (a rumor that the Swedish minister of justice had been with prostitutes, that the Swedish police had knowledge of it and had informed the prime minister). Leif G.W. Persson lost his job at the police because talking to a journalist about his knowledge about the Geijer case, but denied in the preface of the book (Grisfesten) which he wrote soon after, that it had any connections to the affair.

Widerberg took inspiration from the 1971 American film The French Connection, and The Man from Majorca share similarities with his previous thriller film: The Man on the Roof (1976).

Sven Wollter won the award for Best Actor at the 20th Guldbagge Awards.

Plot
A robber calmly holds up a post-office in Stockholm at Saint Lucy's Day 13 December. The policemen Johansson and Jarnebring are the first on the scene and they chase the robber, who escapes. Shortly after, someone dies in a car accident and a dead body is found at a graveyard. After a while it is clear that these incidents have something to do with the robbery, and when the policemen are investigating further, they are beginning to reveal a bigger scandal. Meanwhile it seems that there is a cover-up going on.

Cast 
 Sven Wollter as Bo Jarnebring: Inspector on the investigation department
 Tomas von Brömssen as Lars Martin "Johan" Johansson: Jarnebring's colleague
 Håkan Serner as Andersson: Inspector
 Ernst Günther as M. Dahlgren: Inspector and chief
 Thomas Hellberg as Berg: Bureau chief
 Ingvar Hirdwall as Fors 
 Niels Jensen as Roger "Rogge" Jansson: High school student, previously small criminal  
 Tommy Johnson as Rundberg: Inspector
 Rico Rönnbäck as Kjell Göran Hedberg: Working at the Swedish Security Service
 Hans Villius as The Minister for Justice
 Sten Lonnert as Erik Harald Olsson: Alcoholic
 Nina Gunke as Eva Zetterberg: Prostitute 
 Margreth Weivers as Alva Wiström: Witness on Skogskyrkogården
 Gun Karlsson as Fru Forsberg: Witness to the post office robbery
 Marie Delleskog as Janna: Jansson's sister

Trivia
 Carl-Gustaf Lindstedt was originally chosen for the role of Dahlgren but was replaced by Ernst Günther due to illness just after three days of shooting.
 Some scenes were filmed without permission from the Stockholm police, like the scenes in the subway, because Widerberg was too impatient to wait for the permit. There had been some disputes with the police regarding the helicopter crash scene in his previous thriller The Man on the Roof at Odenplan (also seen in this movie) and for that the film team had to borrow cars from the Solna police instead.
 The movie was shot mainly on Mondays due to the schedules of the two leads who were both appearing in theatre at the time: Sven Wollter in Gävle and Tomas von Brömssen in Gothenburg. Mondays were the only days that both were free.
 Bo Widerberg wanted more realistic, risky, scenes for the car chase scene at Klarastrandsleden and filmed some additional scenes with the actors driving against real traffic.
 There are similarities between The Man from Majorca and Widerberg's first thriller The Man on the Roof (actors, extras, clothes), but also similarities with the 1971 thriller The French Connection (two cops' police work, Christmas setting, quarrel between departments, car chase, unsettling ending), which also was an inspiration for this film.

References

Notes
 Stardust Allt om Film Magazine #2 2007, article "Sveriges bästa snutar" pp 72–73, It is media Svenska AB, Stockholm

External links
 
 

1984 films
Swedish crime films
1980s Swedish-language films
Films based on Swedish novels
Films directed by Bo Widerberg
Swedish Christmas films
1980s Christmas films
1980s Swedish films